"Whateva Man" is the second single released for Redman's third album, Muddy Waters. It is a mellow track produced by and featuring Erick Sermon, although he is not in the video. Method Man and Keith Murray appear in the video, although they are not on the song. It reached number 42 on the Billboard Hot 100 making it the most popular single from Muddy Waters. It was included in the 1997 version of The Source Presents: Hip Hop Hits. A remixed version can be found on Too Short's Nationwide: Independence Day compilation. Pete Rock also contributed a remix for possible inclusion on the single; however, it was relegated to exclusive radio play. The video is a parody of the film The Blues Brothers.

Single track list

A-Side
 Whateva Man (radio edit)
 Whateva Man (LP version)
 Whateva Man (TV track)

B-Side
 Smoke Buddah (LP version)
 Whateva Man (instrumental)
 Whateva Man (a cappella)

Charts

Weekly charts

Year-end charts

References

1997 singles
Redman (rapper) songs
Song recordings produced by Erick Sermon
Def Jam Recordings singles
1997 songs
Songs written by Erick Sermon
Songs written by Redman (rapper)